The Kokoyah Administrative District is one of eight districts located in Bong County, Liberia.

References

Districts of Liberia
Bong County